Mooresville is a large town located in the southwestern section of Iredell County, North Carolina, United States, and is a part of the fast-growing Charlotte metropolitan area. The population was 50,193 at the 2020 United States Census making it the largest municipality in Iredell County.

Mooresville is best known as the home of many NASCAR racing teams and drivers, along with an IndyCar team and its drivers, as well as racing technology suppliers, which has earned the town the nickname "Race City USA". Also located in Mooresville is the corporate headquarters of Lowe's Corporation and Universal Technical Institute's NASCAR Technical Institute.

Geography
Mooresville is located in southern Iredell County at  (35.584337, −80.820139). Interstate 77 passes through the western side of the town, with access from Exits 31 through 36. I-77 leads south to the South Carolina border and north to the Virginia line. Statesville, just to the north, is the county seat.

History
The area that would develop into the town of Mooresville was originally settled by English, German, and Scots-Irish families who moved into the area from nearby Rowan County, as well as from Virginia, Pennsylvania, and elsewhere. Many were seeking new lands on which to establish farms. Many of the early families such as the Wilsons, Davidsons, Cowans, Sherrills, Torrances, and others came to the area as early as the mid-1700s. They formed small communities that eventually grew into the community known as "Deep Well", which took its name from a large natural well that was found in the area.

Many of these families established large farms, primarily of cotton, which grew into small plantations by the 1850s. His property was known as Mount Mourne Plantation, named after the Mourne Mountains of County Down in Northern Ireland. Several other historic plantation homes are set in the area as well, including the Johnson-Neel House, the Cornelius House, Forest Dell Plantation, and the colonial era Belmont Plantation.

In 1856, a railroad was placed on a ridge that crossed the land of a local farmer by the name of John Franklin Moore. A small-scale planter, Moore set up a depot on his land, and encouraged others to help establish a small village on the location in the late 1850s. The little village, known as "Moore's Siding", was born. The Civil War hampered developments, with the railroad tracks being removed to aid the Confederate efforts in Virginia. After the war, the tracks were returned, and Moore's Siding slowly began to prosper.

Shortly after the Civil War, John Franklin Moore saw the need for the village to incorporate into a town. The town was incorporated as Mooresville in 1873. Moore helped to establish the first brick factory in Mooresville, and built some of the first brick buildings on Main Street. He died in 1877, and his wife, Rachel Summrow Moore, continued the development of the town.

In 1883 the railroad lines were run back through the town with the addition of a new depot. The railroad brought growth to the town, which continued with the addition of the first water plant in the early 1890s, the establishment of a library in 1899, a phone company in 1893 and the first of many textile mills in 1900.

In 1938, artist Alicia Weincek painted the mural North Carolina Cotton Industry in the town's post office, having won a WPA competition for the commissioned work. 
 
The Mooresville Moors were a minor league baseball team who played in the Class D North Carolina State League from 1937 to 1942. The league ceased operations for two seasons due to World War II but was reorganized in 1945.

Selma Burke, a prominent sculptor during the Harlem Renaissance who was born and raised in Mooresville, created the bust of President Franklin D. Roosevelt for the Four Freedoms plaque on the Recorder of Deeds building in Washington, D.C. The bust would later be used for the image on the United States dime.

On October 3, 2015, Duke reported that a sinkhole had formed at the base of the Marshall Steam Station dam on Lake Norman. The Department of Environmental Quality (DEQ) says Duke placed a liner in the hole and filled it with crushed stone.

Race City USA
Mooresville is branded as "Race City USA". The town is home to more than 60 NASCAR teams and racing-related businesses, as well as an IndyCar team. Mooresville features two automotive museums: the Memory Lane Motorsports and Historical Automotive Museum, and the North Carolina Auto Racing Hall of Fame. The Mooresville Convention & Visitors Bureau is the official resource for travelers.

Demographics

2020 census

As of the 2020 United States census, there were 50,193 people, 14,233 households, and 9,866 families residing in the town.

2000 census
In the 2000 census, there were 18,823 people, 7,139 households, and 5,082 families residing in the town. The population density was 1,281.6 people per square mile (494.7/km2). There were 7,741 housing units at an average density of 527.1 per square mile (203.5/km2). The racial makeup of the town was 81.54% White, 14.23% African American, 0.36% Native American, 1.66% Asian, 0.02% Pacific Islander, 1.14% from other races, and 1.06% from two or more races. Hispanic or Latino of any race were 2.55% of the population.

There were 7,139 households, out of which 39.1% had children under the age of 18 living with them, 54.9% were married couples living together, 12.7% had a female householder with no husband present, and 28.8% were non-families. 24.0% of all households were made up of individuals, and 8.1% had someone living alone who was 65 years of age or older. The average household size was 2.58 and the average family size was 3.09.

In the town, the population was spread out, with 28.7% under the age of 18, 7.3% from 18 to 24, 34.3% from 25 to 44, 18.4% from 45 to 64, and 11.2% who were 65 years of age or older. The median age was 34 years. For every 100 females, there were 93.4 males. For every 100 females age 18 and over, there were 88.8 males.

The median income for a household in the town was $42,943, and the median income for a family was $51,011. Males had a median income of $39,524 versus $24,939 for females. The per capita income for the town was $20,549. About 5.6% of families and 7.2% of the population were below the poverty line, including 7.5% of those under age 18 and 12.3% of those age 65 or over.

Government
The town of Mooresville is run in a Commission-Manager style of municipal government with the Town Manager being Randy Hemann. The Mooresville Board of Commissioners is presided by Mayor Miles Atkins and can be presided over by Mayor Pro Tempore and Ward 4 Commissioner Lisa Qualls in the event of Atkins’ absence.

Transportation and highways

The following highways pass through or around Mooresville:

Interstate 77 - passes through the western side of Mooresville.
US 21- passes through the western side of Mooresville, running parallel to I-77 approximately one mile east of I-77
North Carolina Highway 3- passes through downtown Mooresville.  The number is in recognition of the late NASCAR driver Dale Earnhardt, whose car number was 3.
North Carolina Highway 115 - passes through downtown Mooresville
North Carolina Highway 150 - passes through the northern side of Mooresville
North Carolina Highway 152 - passes through downtown Mooresville
North Carolina Highway 801 - passes through the northeastern side of Mooresville

Exit 36 from Interstate 77 provides access to NC 150 and downtown Mooresville. Exits 33 and 42 from Interstate 77 provide access to US 21, while Exit 42 also connects with NC 115. Exits 31 (Langtree Road) and 35 (Brawley School Road) also connect I-77 with Mooresville.

The I-77 Express Lanes begin at Exit 36, and continue south through the Mecklenburg County towns of Davidson, Cornelius and Huntersville before terminating in Uptown Charlotte.

Lake Norman Airpark
A thriving "fly-in community", Lake Norman Airpark is home to almost 50 lots. Tie-downs and fuel are available. The airport is owned by the surrounding Lake Norman Airpark Owners Association.

Schools
Mooresville is primarily served by the Mooresville Graded School District, but is also partly in the Iredell-Statesville school system. A proposal in the 2007 North Carolina state budget could have possibly consolidated the two systems. It states that only one school system in a county would be funded. It was stalled in committee though and failed passage. Previous attempts to consolidate have been defeated.

By 2010, every student in the fourth through twelfth grades in the Mooresville Graded School District had a MacBook laptop. Mooresville recently built a new intermediate school and elementary school, then moved the middle school to Mooresville Intermediate School, and is using the old middle school as an extended campus of the Mooresville High School, known as the Magnolia Street Campus.

In 2010, Mooresville Graded School District dedicated and renamed the high school's football stadium after Coach Joe Popp. Coach Popp and the 1961 Mooresville Blue Devils won the NC State High School Football Championship and remain the only team from Mooresville to have that honor. Coach Popp is also a member of the Catawba College Sports Hall of Fame. Coach Popp Stadium is located behind the Magnolia Street Campus of Mooresville High School.

Mooresville is the location of a campus of Mitchell Community College, whose main campus is in Statesville, the county seat of Iredell County.

Mooresville Graded School District
 Park View Elementary (grades K–3)
 South Elementary (grades K–3)
 Rocky River Elementary (grades K–3)
 East Mooresville Intermediate (Grades 4–6)
 Mooresville Intermediate (Grades 4–6)
 Mooresville Middle School (Grades 7–8)
Selma Burke Middle School (PLANNED) 
 Mooresville Senior High School (Grades 9–12)
 N.F. Woods Technology & Art Center (Part of MHS)

Iredell-Statesville School District
 The Brawley International Baccalaureate School
 Woodland Heights Elementary School
 Woodland Heights Middle School
 Lake Norman Elementary School
 Lakeshore Elementary School
 Shepherd Elementary School
 Lakeshore Middle School
 Lake Norman High School
Collaborative College for Technology and Leadership (Early College High School program)
 Coddle Creek Elementary

Private schools
 Lake Norman Christian School (moved to Davidson)
 Davidson Day School (located in Davidson)
 Woodlawn School located 1 mile north of Davidson College in Iredell County

Charter schools
 Pine Lake Preparatory School (Charter School)
 Langtree Charter School

Historic districts
In addition to a number of historic sites including Mount Mourne Plantation, Johnson-Neel House, Cornelius House, and Espy Watts Brawley House, Mooresville is home to the following historic districts listed on the National Register of Historic Places:
Mooresville Historic District, which includes much of the downtown commercial district;
Mooresville Mill Village Historic District, a residential area near the former mill site; and
South Broad Street Row, a district of older homes, some now in commercial use, near downtown.

Notable people
 Greg Anderson, four-time NHRA pro stock champion
 Greg Biffle, NASCAR driver
 Guenther Steiner, Team Principal of the Haas F1 Formula One team
 Ryan Blaney, NASCAR driver
 Nicole Briscoe, ESPN host
 Ryan Briscoe, INDYCAR driver
 Selma Burke, sculptor/artist
 Kurt Busch, NASCAR driver
 Kyle Busch, NASCAR driver
 Dale Earnhardt, NASCAR Hall of Famer
 Dale Earnhardt Jr., retired NASCAR driver and NASCAR Hall of Famer
 Jeffrey Earnhardt, NASCAR driver
 Kerry Earnhardt, retired NASCAR driver
 Chase Elliott, NASCAR driver
 Suellen Evans, college student and murder victim
 Jeff Gordon, retired NASCAR driver
 Tanner Gray, NHRA pro stock driver and NASCAR driver
 Hayes Grier, social media personality
 Nash Grier, social media personality
 Will Grier, American football quarterback for the West Virginia Mountaineers and Carolina Panthers
 Melissa Morrison-Howard, track hurler, two-time Olympic bronze medalist
 Dan Jansen, retired speed skater
 Michael Jordan, basketball legend’s new NASCAR team, 23XI Racing, has its base in Mooresville.
 Kasey Kahne, NASCAR driver
 Brad Keselowski, NASCAR driver
 David Levine, ARCA and NASCAR driver
 Jason Line, three time NHRA pro stock champion, 1993 NHRA Stock Eliminator Champion
 Joey Logano, NASCAR driver
 John J. Mack, investment banker 
 Olindo Mare, kicker
 J. B. Mauney, bull rider for the PBR association
 Jack Melchor, venture capitalist
 John Franklin Moore (1822–1877), founder of Mooresville
 Joe Nemechek, NASCAR driver
 John Hunter Nemechek, NASCAR driver and son of Joe Nemechek
 Thomas O'Keefe, musician
 Julius Peppers, defensive end formerly of the Carolina Panthers, Chicago Bears and Green Bay Packers
 Jim Popp, General Manager 5-time Grey Cup Champion Canadian Football League
 Will Power, INDYCAR driver
 Riki Rachtman MTV TV Radio host
 Charles Robinson, WWE referee
 Reed Sorenson, NASCAR driver
 Ricky Steamboat, former professional wrestler
 J.R. Sweezy, NFL Offensive Guard 
 Forrest Thompson, former Major League Baseball pitcher
 Curt White, former Olympic weightlifter
 Ritchie 'TJ' Beams, radio personality, The Ace & TJ Show

Sister city
Mooresville has one sister city, as designated by Sister Cities International:
  Hockenheim, Baden-Württemberg, Germany – home of the Hockenheimring, a well-known racetrack. This relationship was started and led in 2002 by Mooresville Senior High School German teacher, Audrey McCulloh.

References

External links

 
 Mooresville Tribune
 Mooresville Weekly
 City-Data information page
 Mooresville Graded School District

Towns in North Carolina
Towns in Iredell County, North Carolina
1856 establishments in North Carolina